"Midnight, the Stars and You" is a British-American popular foxtrot song written by Harry M. Woods, Jimmy Campbell and Reg Connelly and published in 1934.

The most famous recorded version was performed in 1934 by Ray Noble and his Orchestra with an uncredited Al Bowlly on vocals. A foxtrot-tempo ballad, the song is considered one of Bowlly's "outstanding" vocal efforts.

Other recordings of this song are by Hal Kemp and his orchestra, and Roy Fox and his band, both recorded in 1934.
It is notable for appearing in Stanley Kubrick's 1980 Horror film, The Shining

Use in cinema and other media 
The Bowlly rendition was used twice in Stanley Kubrick's 1980 classic horror film The Shining; once in the Gold Room (ballroom) scene, and also over the closing of the film as the camera closes in the protagonist in a photograph from the early 20th century, carrying over into the credits. The popularity of this film associated this version of the song to a sense of unease or impending menace in cinema and other media. These include:
 the 1981 horror film Dead & Buried
 the 1999 ambient album Selected Memories from the Haunted Ballroom;
 the 2005 comedy-drama Colour Me Kubrick,
 the 2006 comedy-horror Behind the Mask: The Rise of Leslie Vernon
 the 2013 and 2018 thrillers Snowpiercer and The Outsider,
 the closing theme for The John Batchelor Show and The Last Podcast on the Left,
 in the first episode of the 2013 video game BioShock Infinite expansion Burial at Sea, while Booker and Elizabeth are searching for a missing girl named Sally in a bistro restaurant at Fontaine's Department Store,
 the 2018 film Ready Player One,
 the 2019 film Toy Story 4 when Woody and Forky enter the antique store, continuing a trend of Pixar films referencing Kubrick films,
 "Girl's in the Band", the 19th episode in Season 30 of The Simpsons. In one scene Homer Simpson is losing his sanity due to sleep deprivation on a night shift at the power station, and finds himself in the ballroom of the Overlook Hotel. Homer dances with a woman as the song begins, and sits at the bar as it continues. Lloyd the bartender tries to convince Homer to kill his family through radiation poisoning, but Homer does not comprehend what Lloyd is asking. When Homer awakes, Jack Torrance is seen running with an axe into the reactor room.
 The song is featured in the 2019 film adaptation of Doctor Sleep. A sequel to Kubrick's adaptation of The Shining, Doctor Sleep also features "Midnight, the Stars and You" twice. Abra faintly hears it while wandering the abandoned remains of the Overlook Hotel just moments before the building attempts to attack her; the song later appears in the closing moments of the film as Abra prepares to imprison an apparition of an undead woman that tormented Danny Torrance in the film's opening, before continuing to play over the credits (as in The Shining).
 In Season 46, Episode 15 of Saturday Night Live, the song is used in a skit with host and previous cast member Maya Rudolph, which pays homage to The Shining.’'
 2022 used in background of ‘All Creatures Great and Small’, season 2, episode 4, ‘Many Happy Returns’.
 Plays several times in the 2022 BritBox miniseries of Agatha Christie's Why Didn't They Ask Evans?'' adapted and directed by Hugh Laurie.

References

External Link 
Midnight, the Stars and You 
Songs written by Jimmy Campbell and Reg Connelly
Songs written by Harry M. Woods
1934 songs
Al Bowlly songs
Foxtrots